Palos Blancos is a location in the La Paz Department in Bolivia. It is the seat of the Palos Blancos Municipality, the fourth municipal section of the Sud Yungas Province.

References 

 Instituto Nacional de Estadística de Bolivia 

Populated places in La Paz Department (Bolivia)